William Rooks (14 December 1890–1972) was an English footballer who played in the Football League for Accrington Stanley and Blackpool.

References

1890 births
1972 deaths
English footballers
Association football midfielders
English Football League players
Willington A.F.C. players
Blackpool F.C. players
Accrington Stanley F.C. (1891) players
Ashton United F.C. players
Great Harwood F.C. players